Star Wars: Where Science Meets Imagination is a traveling exhibition created by the Museum of Science, Boston, featuring props and costumes used in the Star Wars films, but focusing primarily on the science behind George Lucas' science fiction epic.  Star Wars: Where Science Meets Imagination was developed by Boston's Museum of Science, in collaboration with Lucasfilm Ltd., with the support of the National Science Foundation, under Grant No. 0307875. This exhibit is presented nationally by Bose Corporation.

The exhibit premiered in Boston in 2005, and drew nearly 3 million visitors across the United States and Australia and before making its final appearance in San Jose, California. A companion book was released in 2005.

History 
The exhibit was developed over a period of four years, beginning in 2002. It opened to the public at the Museum of Science on October 27, 2005. George Lucas was the guest of honor at the Museum of Science's Grand Opening Gala; Anthony Daniels was the master of ceremonies.

The exhibit left Boston on April 30, 2006, to commence its 20-venue international tour.

Features

The primary focus of the exhibit is the introduction of modern science and technology through the lens of Star Wars. Topics ranging from space travel, mechanical prosthetics, robotics, and levitation technology such as is seen in hovercraft and Maglev trains are addressed through hands-on activities and volunteer demonstrations.

Interactive displays
The exhibit includes a reproduction of the Millennium Falcons cockpit, which features a four-and-a-half minute experience about real-world space exploration, particularly the unmanned exploration of the farther planets of our solar system, and the hundreds of exoplanets that have been discovered. The experience is narrated by Anthony Daniels, who played C-3PO, and with a few added effects in the cockpit (rumbling seats, fans, and lights) is meant to simulate the appearance of actually traveling through space and looking out the cockpit viewscreen. This exhibit was not included in the version at the Powerhouse Museum.

The "Living on Tatooine" section of the exhibit features three augmented reality kiosks in which visitors interact with a virtual environment on a large screen. The environment includes reflected imagery of the visitor and computer-generated elements from the Star Wars universe which are attached to the prop in the video. Visitors move physical props in order to complete tasks of increasing complexity to build communities in the three simulated environments. The kiosks were developed by ARToolworks, Inc.. When the user is interacting with the props the user and props appear in the video but once placed, the video takes over the whole screen, the props disappear and the interaction between the computer generated elements is altered by their relative positions.

Also included in the initial 14 venues of this 20 venue tour was the Robot Object Theater. This interactive presentation on robotics narrated by C-3PO showed some mocked up specific purpose robots (pipe inspection and welding) and contrasted these with the Star Wars robots, robot soccer and the Kismet (robot). It provided an interesting insight into some of the current thinking on how to improve the usefulness of robotics and the nature of the interaction between robots and humans.

Props and costumes
The exhibit includes an impressive number of props, costumes and models, including the Yoda puppet, C-3PO, "Naked" C-3PO, R2-D2, the three-section Darth Vader helmet from Star Wars: Episode III – Revenge of the Sith, as well as the models of the X-wing, Millennium Falcon and many others used in the films. There are also costumes for Mace Windu, Princess Leia, Anakin Skywalker, Obi-Wan Kenobi and the stormtroopers, and lightsabers belonging to Luke, Obi-Wan, Darth Maul and Count Dooku, among a great many other costumes, props and models.
On January 16, the Boba Fett costume was added to replace the Chewbacca costume.

Other features
There is also a multimedia tour which uses a PDA to provide not only audio content, but also video and still images, adding to the visitor's experience. The PDA has a "bookmark" feature, that allows visitors to email special features of the exhibit to their email address. The exhibition also includes a number of documentary videos about the technology of Star Wars and the comparison of real-world technology to that of the Star Wars universe.

Awards 
One of the computer interactives in the exhibit, Human or Machine?, developed by interactive media developer Paula Sincero (InquiryLearn) in collaboration with Museum of Science (Boston) was honored with an honorable mention in the 2006 Media & Technology MUSE Awards in the science category by the American Alliance of Museums (AAM). "MUSE awards recognize outstanding achievement in Galleries, Libraries, Archives, and Museums (GLAM) media. The Media & Technology Professional Network’s annual awards are presented to institutions that enhance the GLAM experience and engage audiences with useful and innovative digital programs and services. The MUSE awards celebrate scholarship, community, innovation, creativity, education, accessibility, and inclusiveness...Winning projects for each category are chosen by an international group of GLAM technology professionals." (from the AAM website)

The multi-person, role-playing interactive encourages interaction among museum visitors around ethics and decision-making at the intersection of science and society. Humor, surprise, compelling animations, and thought-provoking questions prompt reflection and visitor discussion about the possible consequences of human augmentation as visitors are invited to augment themselves (or not) and see how various scenarios play out. By tapping into both the head and heart, this popular, award-winning interactive stimulates the imagination and invites spirited debate!

Book
A companion book of the same name, produced by Lucasbooks, and edited by the Boston Museum of Science was published by National Geographic in October 2005. The book's introduction is by Anthony Daniels who played the famous character C-3PO in the Star Wars saga. The book mainly discusses the same themes and concepts as covered by the traveling exhibition. A second edition of the book was released in September 2006.

Tour schedule
 Museum of Science, Boston, Massachusetts - October 19, 2005 - April 30, 2006
 COSI Columbus, Columbus, Ohio - June 3, 2006 - September 4, 2006
 Oregon Museum of Science and Industry, Portland, Oregon - October 11, 2006 - January 1, 2007
 California Science Center, Los Angeles, California - February 11, 2007 - April 29, 2007
 Fort Worth Museum of Science and History, Fort Worth, Texas - June 9, 2007 - September 3, 2007
 Museum of Science and Industry (MSI), Chicago, Illinois - October 5, 2007 - January 6, 2008
 Franklin Institute, Philadelphia, Pennsylvania - February 2008 through May 4, 2008
 Science Museum of Minnesota, Saint Paul, Minnesota - June 13, 2008 - August 24, 2008
 Powerhouse Museum, Sydney, Australia, - December 4, 2008 - April 26, 2009
 Scienceworks, Melbourne, Australia, - June 4, 2009 - November 3, 2009
Anchorage Museum, Anchorage, Alaska  Feb. 9, 2010 - April 25, 2010
 U.S. Space & Rocket Center, Huntsville, Alabama - June 25, 2010 - September 6, 2010
 Lafayette Science Museum, Lafayette, Louisiana - October 21, 2010 - January 17, 2011
 Pacific Science Center, Seattle, Washington - March 19, 2011 - May 9, 2011
 The Health Museum, Houston, Texas - June 18, 2011 - September 18, 2011
 Discovery Science Center, Santa Ana, California - November 18, 2011 - April 15, 2012
 Exploration Place, Wichita, Kansas - May 26 - September 3, 2012
 Orlando Science Center, Orlando, Florida - October 13, 2012 – April 7, 2013
 Indiana State Museum, Indianapolis, Indiana - May 25 - September 2, 2013
 The Tech Museum of Innovation, San Jose, California - October 19, 2013 - March 23, 2014. 
The final venue of the tour was announced in Spring 2013.

See also
Science of Star Wars (miniseries)

References

External links
Star Wars: Where Science Meets Imagination on the official Star Wars news site.
Official Exhibition Site: Powerhouse Museum Sydney
Official Exhibition Site: Science Museum of Minnesota (Saint Paul)
Official Exhibition Site: Museum of Science, Boston
Professors Showcasing Science Behind Star Wars’ Technology in Indiana State Museum’s 'Science Nights'

Where Science Meets Imagination
Traveling exhibits
Science fiction exhibitions